Hoops Club is a Lebanese sports club. It is based in Beirut, Lebanon, with further branches in Antelias, Tyre, and southern suburbs of Beirut (Dahieh). Hoops club basketball team is part of the Lebanese Basketball League playing in division A. 
Hoops Club is a Lebanese sports club. It is based in Beirut, Lebanon, with further branches in Antelias, Tyre, and southern suburbs of Beirut. Hoops club basketball team is part of the Lebanese Basketball League playing in division A.

Squad

External links
Hoops Club Official site

Basketball teams in Lebanon
Basketball teams established in 2001
2001 establishments in Lebanon